Prolegomena de comoedia is a modern collective name for several short ancient Greek and Byzantine writings in Greek that are mostly found in the manuscripts of Aristophanes' comedies or taken as excerpts from other texts. These writings are important for deepening the knowledge about the development of Greek comedy. In Dindorf's edition, the texts are given in the usual order:

 Platonius, On the feature of comedy.
 Platonius, On the feature of styles
 Anonymous, On comedy. This short essay is often cited because it gives a historical view of the origins of Greek comedy, thus supplementing the scanty information given by Aristotle in his Poetics, as well as a concise overview of the historical development of comedy from Epicharmus and Magnetes to Diphilus. This is the most frequently quoted work from the Prolegomena de comoedia and, unless otherwise stated, this is the essay referred to when the work On Comedy is cited in the literature.
 Anonymous, On comedy ― the author of this essay is different from the previous one.
 Anonymous, On comedy ― the author of this essay is different from the previous ones.
 Anonymous, On comedy ― the author of this essay, which consists of only few sentences, is different from the previous ones.
 A short essay of a few sentences, by an unknown author, about the chorus in comic plays.
 List of names of seven poets of the Old Attic Comedy and the number of plays each of them wrote.
 Anonymous, On comedy ― from a scholium in Dyonisius Thrax's Grammar.
 Andronicus, On the order of poets.
 Anonymous, Life of Aristophanes ― an ancient biography of Aristophanes.
 A biography of Aristophanes by another author.
 A biography of Aristophanes by yet another author.
 Entry on Aristophanes in Suda.
 Thomas Magister, a short biography of Aristophanes.
 Antipater of Thessalonica, verses about Aristophanes and Diodorus' epitaph on the grave of Aristophanes (from the Palatine Anthology).
 Demetrius Triclinius, an essay on metres.

A work by Dionysiades entitled Styles or Lovers of Comedy, "in which he describes the styles of [comic] poets", may have served as a foundation and starting point for at least some of these writings. This work seems to be the first attempt to make a distinction between different literary styles of Attic comedians.

References

External links 

 Prolegomena de comoedia in: Wilhelm Dindorf (ed.), Aristophanis Comoediae, pp. 19–44.
 A Short History of Comedy, English translation of the essay on the history of comedy listed under No. 3.

Greek comedy